Grady Demond Wilson (born October 13, 1946) is an American actor and author. He portrayed Lamont Sanford, the son of Fred Sanford (played by Redd Foxx) in the NBC sitcom Sanford and Son (1972–77), and Oscar Madison in The New Odd Couple (1982–83). He appeared in the film Me and the Kid (1993).

Early life and career
Wilson was born in Valdosta, Georgia, in 1946, and grew up in New York City, where he studied tap dance and ballet. He made his Broadway debut at age four and danced at Harlem's Apollo Theater at twelve.  Wilson was raised as a Catholic and served as an altar boy. His grandmother was Pentecostal, and Wilson briefly discerned the Catholic priesthood. At age thirteen, Wilson's appendix ruptured, almost killing him, but he vowed to serve God as an adult in some ministerial capacity.

Wilson served in the United States Army from 1966 to 1968 and was in the 4th Infantry Division in Vietnam, where he was wounded. Upon returning home as a decorated veteran in the late 1960s, Wilson was featured in several Broadway and off-Broadway stage productions before moving to Hollywood, where he performed guest roles on several television series such as Mission: Impossible and All in the Family and acted in films such as The Organization (1971) and Dealing: Or the Berkeley-to-Boston Forty-Brick Lost-Bag Blues (1972).

Sanford and Son (1972–1977) and other acting projects
Later in 1971, after appearing as a robber on All in the Family with Cleavon Little, Wilson won the role of Lamont Sanford in the NBC sitcom Sanford and Son. Johnny Brown was considered for that role, but because of his commitment to Laugh-In, Wilson got the role instead. Wilson played Lamont through the run of the series, and became the star when Redd Foxx walked off the show in 1974 over a salary dispute with the producers and his character was written out for the rest of the season. Foxx returned the following year, and the pair worked together until 1977 when the show was cancelled. In 1980–1981, Foxx attempted to revive the show with the short-lived sitcom Sanford, but Wilson refused to reprise his role for the new series.

When asked in 2014 if he kept in touch with anybody from Sanford & Son, especially Foxx (who died on October 11, 1991), he responded:

No. I saw Redd Foxx once before he died, circa 1983, and I never saw him again. At the time I was playing tennis at the Malibu Racquet Club and I was approached by some producers about doing a Redd Foxx 50th Anniversary Special. I hadn’t spoken to him since 1977, and I called the club where (Redd) was playing. And we met at Redd’s office, but he was less than affable. I told those guys it was a bad idea. I never had a cross word with him. People say I’m protective of Redd Foxx in my book (Second Banana, Wilson’s memoir of the Sanford years). I had no animosity toward Foxx (for quitting the show in 1977) because I had a million dollar contract at CBS to do Baby... I'm Back!. My hurt was that he didn’t come to me about throwing the towel in - I found out in the hallway at NBC from a newscaster. I forgave him and I loved Redd, but I never forgot that. The love was there. You can watch any episode and see that.

Wilson also appeared in the films Full Moon High (1981), Me and the Kid (1993), and Hammerlock (2000).

Baby... I'm Back! (1978), and The New Odd Couple (1982–1983)
Wilson later starred as Raymond Ellis in the short-lived CBS comedy series Baby... I'm Back! and as Oscar Madison, opposite actor Ron Glass (who co-starred as Felix Ungar) in the ABC sitcom The New Odd Couple, a revamped black version of the original 1970–75 series on the same network which starred Jack Klugman and Tony Randall, which was in turn based on the 1968 film starring Jack Lemmon and Walter Matthau.

Author
Wilson has written several Christian books concerning the New Age Movement and the hidden dangers he believes it holds for society. New Age Millennium was released by CAP Publishing & Literary Co. LLC on December 1, 1998. Wilson, who has also authored children's books, called the book an "exposé" of certain New Age "symbols and slogans".

Wilson's memoir Second Banana: The Bittersweet Memoirs of the Sanford & Son Years was released on August 31, 2009. Wilson has said, "It's just a documented truth, behind the scenes factual account of what happened during those years. Redd (Foxx) and I were making history back in those days. We were the first blacks to be on television in that capacity and we opened the door for all those other shows that came after us."

Later appearances and projects
Wilson has also made numerous guest appearances on the Praise The Lord program aired on the Trinity Broadcasting Network, and is a good friend of Clifton Davis. He also appeared as a guest star on the UPN sitcom Girlfriends, playing Lynn's biological father.

In the summer of 2011, Wilson started appearing with actress Nina Nicole in a touring production of the play The Measure of a Man by playwright Matt Hardwick. The play is described as "a faith-based production" and is set in a small town in south Georgia.

Wilson began work in 2010 to produce and act in a melodramatic family film based on the play Faith Ties. Says Wilson of the project: "I play a broken down old drunk whose wife and daughter are killed and he's given up on life. The protagonist is a pastor who is in the middle while he watches the lives of people crumbling around him."

Personal life
Wilson has been married to the former model Cicely Johnston since May 3, 1974. They have six children.

Filmography

Film

Television

References

External links

Official Website - Demond Wilson
TV.Com bio for Demond Wilson

1946 births
Living people
African-American Catholics
African-American male actors
People from Valdosta, Georgia
American male television actors
United States Army personnel of the Vietnam War
Male actors from New York City
Male actors from Georgia (U.S. state)
American male writers
United States Army soldiers
20th-century American male actors
21st-century American male actors
20th-century African-American people
21st-century African-American people